Glory Pier is a light rail station of the Circular Line of the Kaohsiung rapid transit system. It is located in Lingya District, Kaohsiung, Taiwan.

Station overview
The station is a street-level station with two side platforms. It is located at the junction of Cingnian 2nd Road, Yongping Road, and Haibian Road, beside Glory Pier.

Station layout

Around the Station
 Glory Pier
 Lingya/Ziqiang Night Market
 Hanshin Department Store
 Kaohsiung Esports Arena

References

2015 establishments in Taiwan
Railway stations opened in 2015
Circular light rail stations